Marshal General of France, originally "Marshal General of the King's camps and armies", was a title given to signify that the recipient had authority over all of the French armies, in the days when a Marshal of France usually governed only one army. This dignity was bestowed only on Marshals of France, usually when the dignity of Constable of France was unavailable or, after 1626, suppressed.

List of titleholders 
There have only been six holders of this title in the history of France:

Five in the pre-revolutionary kingdom of France:
 Charles de Gontaut, duc de Biron (1562–1602):
 Admiral of France, 1592
 Admiral and Marshal, 26 January 1594
 unclear when promoted to Marshal General
 executed in 1602
 François de Bonne, duc de Lesdiguières (1543–1626):
 Marshal, 27 September 1609
 Marshal General, 30 March 1621
 Constable of France, 6 July 1622
 Henri de La Tour d'Auvergne, vicomte de Turenne (1611–1675):
 Marshal, 16 November 1643
 Marshal General, 4 April 1660
 Claude-Louis-Hector de Villars (1653–1734):
 Marshal, 20 October 1702
 Marshal General, 18 October 1733
 Maurice, comte de Saxe (1696–1750):
 Marshal, 26 March 1744
 Marshal General, 12 January 1747

One during the July Monarchy under the House of Orléans' sole, constitutional king, Louis Philippe:
 Jean-de-Dieu Soult (1769–1851):
 Marshal of the Empire, 19 May 1804
 Marshal General, 15 September 1847

Sources 
 Quid.fr (French language online encyclopedia)
 web.genealogie: les militaires (also online)
 Harper Encyclopedia of Military Biography, edited by Trevor N. Dupuy et al. (most dates are from the latter)

 
 
Military ranks of France